Aceh is a province of Indonesia.

Aceh or ACEH may also refer to:
 Aceh Sultanate
 Aceh cattle
 Mie Aceh
 Angiotensin-converting enzyme 2, an enzyme